Mangelia cibori is an extinct species of sea snail, a marine gastropod mollusk in the family Mangeliidae.

Description
The length of the shell attains 6.4 mm, its diameter 2.5 mm.

Distribution
This extinct marine species was found in Middle Miocene strata in Poland.

References

External links

cibori
Gastropods described in 2003